Summer Camping was a Canadian musical outdoors television series which aired on CBC Television in 1957.

Premise
This series, produced at CBC Montreal, featured instructions from Louis Thomas on canoeing, fire starting, fishing, wood carving and other camping techniques. This was accompanied by campfire songs by musician Alan Mills. Children were featured in the studio audience, as the series was intended for young audiences.

Scheduling
Summer Camping was broadcast on Mondays at 5:00 p.m. from 1 July to 26 August 1957.

External links
 

CBC Television original programming
1957 Canadian television series debuts
1957 Canadian television series endings
Black-and-white Canadian television shows